Television Academy may refer to:


Australia
 Australian Academy of Cinema and Television Arts

Canada
 Academy of Canadian Cinema & Television

Israel
 Israeli Academy of Film and Television

United Kingdom
 British Academy of Film and Television Arts

United States
 Academy of Television Arts & Sciences
 National Academy of Television Arts and Sciences
 International Academy of Television Arts and Sciences